Ectoedemia agrimoniae is a moth of the family Nepticulidae. It is found from Fennoscandia to the Pyrenees, Italy and Greece, and from Great Britain to Ukraine.

The wingspan is 4-6.4 mm. The head is ferruginous ochreous
to brown, the collar dark brown. Antennal eyecaps are yellow - whitish. Forewings grey densely irrorated with blackish ; a narrow curved sometimes interrupted shining white fascia in middle ; outer half of cilia beyond a black line white. Hindwings light grey. Adults are on wing from May to July. There is one generation per year.

The larvae feed on Agrimonia eupatoria and Aremonia agrimonioides. They mine the leaves of their host plant. The mine consists of  a strongly contorted narrow corridor with a linear interrupted frass line. Later, the mine becomes a broad corridor or elongated blotch with dispersed frass. There are often multiple mines in a single leaf. Pupation takes place inside of the mine, in a violet to blackish cocoon.

References

External links
Fauna Europaea
bladmineerders.nl
A Taxonomic Revision Of The Western Palaearctic Species Of The Subgenera Zimmermannia Hering And Ectoedemia Busck s.str. (Lepidoptera, Nepticulidae), With Notes On Their Phylogeny

Nepticulidae
Moths of Europe
Moths described in 1858